Goodwin Hollow Creek is a stream in Laclede County in the Ozarks of south central Missouri.

Goodwin Hollow Creek has the name of Peter Goodwin, a pioneer citizen.

See also
List of rivers of Missouri

References

Rivers of Laclede County, Missouri
Rivers of Missouri